Ramnagar is a census town in the Pandabeswar CD block in the Durgapur subdivision of the Paschim Bardhaman district in the Indian state of West Bengal.

Geography

Location
Mahal, Baidyanathpur, Dalurband, Ramnagar, Bilpahari and Kendra Khottamdi form a cluster of census towns in the northern portion of Pandabeswar CD block.

Urbanisation
According to the 2011 census, 79.22% of the population of the Durgapur subdivision was urban and 20.78% was rural. The Durgapur subdivision has 1 municipal corporation at Durgapur and 38 (+1 partly) census towns  (partly presented in the map alongside; all places marked on the map are linked in the full-screen map).

Demographics
According to the 2011 Census of India, Ramnagar had a total population of 5,446, of which 2,800 (51%) were males and 2,646 (49%) were females. Population in the age group 0–6 years was 647. The total number of literate persons in Ramnagar was 3,332 (69.43% of the population over 6 years).

*For language details see Pandabeswar (community development block)#Language and religion

 India census, Ramnagar had a population of 4926. Males constitute 54% of the population and females 46%. Ramnagar has an average literacy rate of 59%, lower than the national average of 59.5%: male literacy is 69%, and female literacy is 46%. In Ramnagar, 12% of the population is under 6 years of age.

Infrastructure

According to the District Census Handbook 2011, Bardhaman, Ramnagar covered an area of 5.94 km2. Among the civic amenities, the protected water-supply involved service reservoir, tap water from treated sources, uncovered wells. It had 474 domestic electric connections. Among the medical facilities it had were 2 dispensaries/ health centres, 6 medicine shops. Among the educational facilities it had were 3 primary schools. Among the important commodities it produced were paddy, coal, earthen pots.

Education
Ramnagar has one primary school.

References

Cities and towns in Paschim Bardhaman district